Garos is a commune in the Pyrénées-Atlantiques department in south-western France.

References

Communes of Pyrénées-Atlantiques
Pyrénées-Atlantiques communes articles needing translation from French Wikipedia